The Hunterston Brooch is a highly important Celtic brooch of "pseudo-penannular" type found near Hunterston, North Ayrshire, Scotland, in either, according to one account, 1826 by two men from West Kilbride, who were digging drains at the foot of Goldenberry Hill, or in 1830. It is now in the National Museum of Scotland, Edinburgh.  Made within a few decades of 700 AD, the Hunterston Brooch is cast in silver, gilt, and set with pieces of amber (most now missing), and decorated with interlaced animal bodies in gold filigree. The diameter of the ring is 12.2 cm, and in its centre there is a cross and a golden glory representing the Risen Christ, surrounded by tiny bird heads.  The pin, which is broken, can travel freely around the ring as far as the terminals, which was necessary for fastening; it is now 13.1 cm long, but was probably originally 15 cm or more.

The back of the brooch has a scratched inscription in runes in the Old Norse language, probably 10th century, "Melbrigda owns this brooch"; Maél Brigda, "devotee of Bridgit" is a common Gaelic female name, though seen as male by other sources. Much later ownership inscriptions are not uncommon on elaborate Celtic brooches, often from Norse-Gael contexts.  The Hunterston Brooch is clearly an object of very high status, indicating the power and great prestige of its owner. With the Tara Brooch in Dublin and the Londesborough Brooch in the British Museum, it is considered one of the finest of over 50 highly elaborate surviving Irish Celtic brooches, and "arguably the earliest of the ornate penannular brooches from Britain and Ireland".

Possible origin
The Hunterston brooch may have been made at a royal site, such as Dunadd in Argyll, though is more likely to have been made in Ireland, especially as its pseudo-penannular form is typical of Irish brooches, whereas the truly penannular form remained usual in Pictish brooches.  On the other hand, its style is closely comparable to a terminal fragment of a penannular brooch found in Dunbeath in 1860 which probably was made in Scotland; craftsmen may have travelled across the area using the locally popular forms. Lloyd and Jennifer Laing feel it was probably made in Dalriada, and the Museum of Scotland say "The style of the brooch has Irish parallels, while the filigree resembles metalwork from England. The brooch was probably made in western Scotland where the two traditions were joined, or perhaps in Ireland by a craftsman trained in foreign techniques."

Construction
The brooch has a complex construction typical of the most elaborate Irish brooches.  Panels of filigree work were created separately on gold trays, which were then fitted into the main silver-gilt body. On the reverse four panels of silver-gilt were also inserted; as in other examples like the Tara Brooch the decoration on the reverse uses older curvilinear "Celtic" motifs looking back to La Tène style Insular Celtic decoration, though on the Hunterston Brooch such motifs also appear on the front.  The brooch was worn by rulers or gifted from the ruler to people of importance. The Hunterston brooch showed power and wealth in the Viking age.

Notes

References
 Henderson, George; Henderson, Isabel. The Art of the Picts: Sculpture and Metalwork in Early Medieval Scotland.  Thames and Hudson, 2004.  
 Lamb, Rev. John, BD. Annals of an Ayrshire Parish - West Kilbride. Glasgow: John J. Rae, 1896
"Laings", Lloyd Laing and Jennifer Laing. Art of the Celts: From 700 BC to the Celtic Revival, 1992, Thames & Hudson (World of Art), 
 Moss, Rachel. Medieval c. 400—c. 1600: Art and Architecture of Ireland. London: Yale University Press, 2014. 
"NMS"; Hunterston Brooch National Museums of Scotland
Whitfield, Niamh. The "Tara" Brooch:an Irish emblem of status in its European context, in Hourihane, Colum (ed), From Ireland coming: Irish art from the early Christian to the late Gothic period and its European context. Princeton University Press, 2001. , 9780691088259
 Whitfield, Niamh. "The Filigree of the Hunterston and 'Tara' Brooches". In: The Age of Migrating Ideas. Early Medieval Art in Northern Britain and Ireland. Proceedings of the Second International Conference on Insular Art, 1993
Youngs, Susan (ed). "The Work of Angels", Masterpieces of Celtic Metalwork, 6th-9th centuries AD. London: British Museum Press, 1989.

External links

Hunterston Brooch, National Museums of Scotland
Detailed photos of and information on the Brooch

8th century in Scotland
8th-century works
1826 in Scotland
1826 archaeological discoveries
Celtic brooches
Collections of the National Museums of Scotland
History of Argyll and Bute
History of North Ayrshire
Runic inscriptions
Archaeological discoveries in the United Kingdom